Malawi–Spain relations are the bilateral and diplomatic relations between these two countries. Malawi has an embassy in Madrid and a consulate in Barcelona. The Ministry of Foreign Affairs of Spain does not have representation in Lilongwe.
The Spanish Embassy in Harare (Zimbabwe) is accredited to Malawi.

Diplomatic relations 
Bilateral relations between Spain and Malawi are considered excellent. Various meetings have been held in different forums that guarantee an optimal level of understanding between the two countries. There is no open dispute between the authorities of both countries.

Economic relations 
The economic relations between Spain and the African country are punctual and very scarce. In the year 2015 there was a strong increase in our exports, exceeding 5 million euros, mainly due to an export operation of railway signaling materials, for the project to expand the railway network that is developing the Brazilian Vale.

Cooperation 
Spain is committed to the development of the African country through UN, WFP (World Food Program) and through the European Development Fund of the European Union, of which Spain is the fifth taxpayer.

In September 2014, Spain and Malawi signed the MOU (Memorandum of Understanding for Cooperation), with the intention of collaborating in case of natural disasters, agriculture, promotion of renewable energy, food security and sustainable tourism. This framework also highlights the recent financing by Spain of an FAO selection and distribution project
of seeds from which 13,000 households benefited in Ntchisi, Dowa and Kasungu worth 500,000 euros.

See also
 Foreign relations of Malawi
 Foreign relations of Spain

References 

 
Spain
Malawi